Kim Hyong-jik (Korean: 김형직; 10 July 1894 – 5 June 1926) was a Korean independence activist during Japanese rule. He was the father of the North Korean founder Kim Il-sung, the paternal grandfather of Kim Jong-il, and a great-grandfather of the current leader of North Korea, Kim Jong-un.

Biography
Little is known about Kim. Born on 10 July 1894, in the small village of Mangyongdae, situated atop a peak called Mungyungbong ("All-Seeing Peak") just 12 kilometers downstream on the Diadong River from Pyongyang, Kim was the son of Kim Bo-hyon (金輔鉉, 1871–1955).  Kim attended Sungshil School, which was run by American missionaries, and became a teacher and later a herbal pharmacist. He died as a result of numerous medical problems, including third-degree frostbite.

Kim and his wife attended Christian churches, and Kim even served as a part-time Protestant missionary. It was reported that his son, Kim Il-sung, attended church services during his teenage years before becoming an atheist later in life.

Kim Il-sung often spoke of his father's idea of chiwŏn (righteous aspirations).

Kim Jong-il's official government biography states that his grandfather was "the leader of the anti-Japanese national liberation movement and was a pioneer in shifting the direction from the nationalist movement to the communist movement in Korea". Kim Hyong-jik is claimed by North Korea to have convened an important meeting of independence activists in November, 1921 memorialized at the Sansong Revolutionary Site.

Family

 Father: Kim Bo-hyon (김보현; 3 October 1871 – 2 September 1955)
 Paternal grandfather: Kim Ung-u (김응우; 17 June 1848 – 4 October 1878)
 Paternal grandmother: Lady Lee (이씨)
 Mother: Lee Bo-ik (이보익; 31 May 1876 – 18 October 1959)
 Two brothers
 Kim Hyong-rok (김형록)
 Kim Hyong-gwon (김형권; 4 November 1905 – 12 January 1936)
 Three sisters
 Kim Gu-il (김구일녀)
 Kim Hyong-sil (김형실)
 Kim Hyong-bok (김형복)
 Wife: Kang Pan-sok
 First son: Kim Il-sung (김일성; 15 April 1912 – 8 July 1994)
 Second son: Kim Chol-ju (김철주; 12 June 1916 – 14 June 1935)
 Third son: Kim Yong-ju (김영주; 1920–2021)

References

Further reading
 
 
 

1894 births
1926 deaths
Korean independence activists
Korean communists
Korean revolutionaries
Korean Protestants
Kim dynasty (North Korea)